Greater Porto Alegre or the metropolitan area of Porto Alegre is the 5th most populous metro area in Brazil, with an estimated population of 4.3 million inhabitants encompassing 34 municipalities around Porto Alegre, the capital of the state of Rio Grande do Sul.

Currently, it comprises 10 234,012 km2 with a total population of 4 293 050 inhabitants, according to IBGE data of 2017. Only the metropolitan areas of São Paulo, Rio de Janeiro, Belo Horizonte, and Brasília, respectively, are larger than Porto Alegre. Porto Alegre has the 4th largest GDP in the country, estimated at 92 billion dollars.

Greater Porto Alegre is a strategic area for the development of the state, the Southern Cone, and the Mercosur, with an economy based on manufacturing, chemicals, automotive, food, education, steel production, semiconductors, and services, to name a few. It possesses an enormous industrial potential and is home to some of the largest companies in Brazil, and also of many multinationals.

The region is also home to several technology parks and universities, with the federal university UFRGS being recognized by the Ministry of Education (MEC) as the best in Brazil for three years in a row.

Municipalities

Education
The region is home to a few research institutions, such as the federal university UFRGS, UFCSPA, PUCRS and Unisinos, several other smaller universities and colleges. All three major universities have their own technology park, hosting multinational companies such as SAP AG, Hewlett-Packard, and Oracle, as well as several start-ups.

There are also technical high-schools in the region, providing early technical education and workforce for local companies.

Culture

Events
The main event in the region is the state fair, called Expointer.

Transportation

Airports
The main airport serving the region is the Salgado Filho International Airport, which underwent major expansions in recent years, expanding its passager terminals and parking facilities. The main runway is currently being expanded, allowing longer flights in the future.

The airport is linked to the region's subway system, Trensurb, by the Aeromovel, a compressed air moved light rail.
 
The airport is operated by the German company Fraport AG.

Because Salgado Filho Airport cannot expand beyond its only runway, a new airport was proposed in the city of Portao and Nova Santa Rita that would house up to four runways. The new airport is named 20 de Setembro Airport after the symbolic state independence from Brazil in the Farrapos War.

Rail
The Greater Porto Alegre is served by Trensurb, a heavy-rail system linking downtown Porto Alegre to downtown Novo Hamburgo passing through Canoas, Esteio, Sapucaia, and São Leopoldo. There are plans to expand the line to the city of Portao and to the southern neighborhoods of Porto Alegre. The line comprises a mix of elevated and surface-level rail.

A second line of heavy-rail is planned to run from Cachoeirinha to downtown Porto Alegre and up to Viamao, but recent economic downturns have halted the project. This line will include an underground and elevated rail.

Several projects of light-rail are planned or under construction in the area, linking the main subway line to the neighborhoods in Canoas and Porto Alegre.

Highways
The major highways that cross the region are BR-290 (Freeway), BR-116, BR-290, BR-386, BR-448, RS-040, and RS-118.

Ports
The major port is Porto Alegre, but several companies have private terminals along the regions' rivers.

The region also has ferry lines, linking Porto Alegre to Guaiba and between neighborhoods in the capital.

Sports

Football
With soccer being the most popular in Brazil and in the region, the two main sports clubs are Gremio Foot-Ball Porto Alegrense, or just Gremio, and Sport Club Internacional, or International. Both teams have won all major domestic and international competitions, such as the World-Cup Club, Libertdores Cup, Brasileirao, and Brasil Cup.

References

Populated places in Rio Grande do Sul
Porto Alegre
Porto Alegre